Sporogonites was a genus of Lower Devonian land plant with branching axes.  It is known from Europe, Australia and Newfoundland.  It resembles a moss in that many straight axes, which grew to about five centimetres in height and possess terminal sporangia, grow from a planar basal surface.  Its spores were trilete and around 30 µm across.

References 

Early Devonian plants
Prehistoric plant genera